Erel Margalit (born 1 January 1961) is an Israeli high-tech and social entrepreneur. He is the founder and Executive Chairman of the Jerusalem-based venture capital firm Jerusalem Venture Partners (JVP) and the founder of two non-profit organizations “Bakehila” and “Israel Initiative 2020” establishing seven regions of excellence that combine technology and education. He served as a member of the Knesset on behalf of the Labor Party, from election in January 2013 until resigning in October 2017.  Under Margalit's leadership, JVP has raised over $1.4 billion across nine funds, spanning all stages of venture capital, and has orchestrated some of the largest exits out of Israel. Forbes international business magazine selected Margalit as the top-ranking non-American venture capitalist on its prestigious "Midas (The Golden Touch) List.” The Marker Magazine named him the best venture capitalist in Israel.

Early life  
Erel Margalit was born in kibbutz Na'an, the eldest of three siblings. His father, Itzik Margalit, was an officer in the IDF Armored Corps and one of the founders of moshav Kfar Haim, and his mother, Mickey, was a founding member of moshav Avihayil. On his mother's side, he is descended from Jews who immigrated to what was then Ottoman Palestine from Bulgaria in the 19th century, prior to the beginning of the First Aliyah. He is a descendant of Shmuel Tagir, one of the founders of Tel Aviv.

In 1969, when Margalit was eight years old, the family was sent on a mission to Detroit, Michigan where his father was head of a local Hebrew school. While in high school in Michigan, Erel became a point-guard on a local basketball team. After returning to Israel in 1971, the family settled in Karmiel before moving to Jerusalem. He attended Rene Cassin High School and continued to play basketball there. Recognition of his talent led to an offer to join the Israeli youth team, but he declined in favor of serving in an IDF combat unit. He served in the Golani Brigade's "Orev" unit as an operations officer, reaching the rank of sergeant major. As a reservist in 1982, he fought in the First Lebanon War with the IDF's airborne anti-tank division.

Margalit studied philosophy and English literature at the Hebrew University of Jerusalem, where he met his future wife. In 1985 Margalit moved to New York to attend Columbia University where he continued towards a doctorate in philosophy and logic. During his studies he was exposed to Michael Porter's "The Competitive Advantage of Nations," which influenced his doctoral dissertation on the subject, "The Entrepreneur as a Leader in the Historical Process." which he completed in 2007.

In response to the First Intifada and the anti-Israel activities on American campuses, Margalit organized a dialogue group between Israeli and Arab students. Together with other Israeli doctoral students, among them Yossi Dahan and Yossi Bachar, he established groups on eight leading campuses.

Margalit is married to Debbie and has three daughters: Tair, Eden, and Maya.

Business career

Jerusalem Development Authority 
Returning to Israel in 1990, Margalit began to work at the Jerusalem Development Authority under Uzi Wexler, promoting business development and technological entrepreneurship in Jerusalem. During this time, he worked closely with Teddy Kollek. He also worked in cooperation with American governors, among them Mario Cuomo of New York, Pete Wilson of California, James Florio of New Jersey and Rodney Wallace of Massachusetts. Margalit helped to attract  dozens of technology companies to Jerusalem with the aim of turning the city into a high-tech capital for Israel. In three years, he succeeded in bringing in 70 large technology companies, including Digital and IBM. In June 1994,  Margalit left the JDA and embarked on an independent career.

Jerusalem Venture Partners (JVP) 

In 1993, Erel Margalit founded the JVP venture capital fund. In October 2018, the New York City Economic Development Corporation (NYCEDC) named JVP among its partners on a new cybersecurity initiative, alongside academic institutions including New York University (NYU) and Columbia University. Called Cyber NYC, JVP will operate the initiative's investment arm, Hub.NYC, which will focus on growth-stage startups and will also offer access to clients and business support.

The Media Quarter 

In 2006, Erel Margalit formed and developed the new Media Quarter in and around the historical train station compound in Jerusalem. With over 200 dynamic entrepreneurs in the Business, Social and Cultural enterprises, the JVP Media Quarter houses start-ups, VC fund JVP, early stage initiative- JVP Play, Our Crowd incubator- Labs/02, the performing arts hub – "Zappa Jerusalem in The Lab," the social profit organization – “In the Community” (Bakehila), as well as a restaurant and a nightclub.

Social entrepreneurship

In the Community (Bakehila) 
In 2002, Marglit founded the social organization Bakehila (בקהילה "In the Community" in Hebrew) as a means of reducing the socio-economic gap affecting disadvantaged children in Jerusalem. Bakehila runs educational programs in lower socioeconomic neighborhoods of Jerusalem with the goal of raising the students' academic achievements, and promoting the children's personal and interpersonal growth. Thousands of students from Jerusalem have attended the program during its first eight years. In 2012, Bakehila opened an educational enrichment center in the Arab neighborhood of Beit Safafa. In 2018, Bakehila began working in underprivileged neighborhoods in Kiryat Shmona.

The Lab (Hama'abada) 
Following the events of the Second Intifada and the massive departure of young artists from Jerusalem, Erel Margalit created The Lab (Hama'abada) to keep and attract young artists in Israel's capital. The Lab provides support and assistance to these artists, providing venues for young Israelis to create, perform, and receive feedback on their work. Today, The Lab is the Jerusalem music club and restaurant, Zappa.

Political career

2005 elections 
During the 2005 election campaign, Margalit was one of the first businessmen to support Amir Peretz in the general elections. He joined the Labor Party and expressed his support of Peretz's social agenda. Margalit promoted his vision of economic growth whereby the ultra-Orthodox and Arab populations would be integrated in the labor market in Israel, thus taking them out of poverty and alleviating pressure on the middle classes. In addition, Margalit presented a plan for bringing the communities of Israel's geographic periphery closer to the center of the country, both economically and socially.

Avoda Now Movement 
Since his initial support of the Labor Party, Margalit grew disillusioned with the direction of the party and its leadership. On January 17, 2011, the Chairman of the Labor Party, Ehud Barak, announced his resignation from the Labor Party and the establishment of a new party – "Atzmaut" (Independence Party). Two days after this announcement Margalit helped to found the "Avoda Now" movement together with prominent members of Israel's business, technology, and cultural community, calling for a revival of the Labor Party. The movement launched a public campaign calling the people to join the Labor party lines; with the aim of renewing its institutions, restoring its social values, and choosing a new, dynamic leadership.

On April 27, 2011, saying he could "no longer watch from the sidelines as the political situation in Israel deteriorates", Margalit announced his intention to run for the chairmanship of Israel's Labor Party.

In the Knesset 
On 5 February 2013 Margalit became a Member of the Israeli Knesset and currently serves as a member of the prestigious Finance Committee and the Science and Technology Committee. He has been called the richest member of the Knesset.  Margalit was especially active in the 2013 budget discussions criticizing its lack of economic growth engines (See ), and called to cancel the bi-yearly budget. He also led the Opposition on the discussions of the "HARIKUZIUT" bill, aimed to target the over-concentration and centralization in the Israeli economy.
Margalit chairs the Parliamentary Task Forces for Economic Development in the North and the Negev, Civilian Cyber Protection and Combating Living Costs in Israel, and co-chairs the Parliamentary Task Force for Small and Medium Businesses, Integrating the Ultra-Orthodox in the High-Tech Sector, Employment for the Arab-Israeli Sector, 40+ Employment , and the Task Force for the City of Jerusalem where he often criticizes the Israeli Government's policy of worrying about Jerusalem's borders but ignoring its content and neglecting its poor economic status.

In the 2013 Labor Party leadership election Margalit announced his support for the candidacy of MK Isaac Herzog for chairman. Margalit was re-elected to the Knesset in the 2015 elections. In 2017 he contested the Labor Party leadership election, but was knocked out in the first round of voting. He subsequently resigned from the Knesset in October 2017 and was replaced by Leah Fadida.

References

External links

1961 births
Living people
Israeli Venture capitalists
Israeli businesspeople
Israeli Sephardi Jews
Columbia Graduate School of Arts and Sciences alumni
Hebrew University of Jerusalem alumni
Israeli Labor Party politicians
Zionist Union politicians
Members of the 19th Knesset (2013–2015)
Members of the 20th Knesset (2015–2019)
Israeli people of Bulgarian-Jewish descent